is a Japanese professional baseball Catcher for the Fukuoka SoftBank Hawks of Nippon Professional Baseball.

Early baseball career
Umino participated in the 2rd grade summer the 96th Japanese High School Baseball Championship as a Catcher of the Kanzei High School with Yūya Ogō. 

Umino went on to Tokai University and won the Batting Leader Award in the Tokyo Metropolitan Area University Baseball League in the spring of his 3rd grade.

Professional career
On October 17, 2019, Umino was drafted by the Fukuoka SoftBank Hawks in the 2019 Nippon Professional Baseball draft.

On September 18, 2020, Umino debuted in the Pacific League against the Tohoku Rakuten Golden Eagles. And in the match against the Saitama Seibu Lions on November 1, he participated as a starter. In 2020 season, he played in 5 games in the Pacific League. In the 2020 Japan Series against the Yomiuri Giants, he was selected as the Japan Series roster, and participated as a bench player.

October 25, 2021, Umino recorded his first hit in the final game of the season against the Chiba Lotte Marines. He also played 11 games in the Pacific League during the 2021 season.

In 2022 season, He finished the regular season with a .167 batting average, one home run, and four runs batted in in 47 games as a reserve catcher. On August 26, 2022, Umino recorded his first home run against the Hokkaido Nippon-Ham Fighters.

International career

Umino was elected to the Japan national baseball team at the 2018 Haarlem Baseball Week, and was elected to the Japan national baseball team at the 2018  USA VS Japan Collegiate All-Star Series and the 2019 USA VS Japan Collegiate All-Star Series.

References

External links

 Career statistics - NPB.jp
 62 Takashi Umino PLAYERS2022 - Fukuoka SoftBank Hawks Official site

1997 births
Living people
Tokai University alumni
Fukuoka SoftBank Hawks players
Japanese baseball players
Nippon Professional Baseball catchers
Baseball people from Okayama Prefecture